Kaintuck may refer to:

 Kaintuck, a Kentucky frontiersman on the Natchez Trace
 Kaintuck (film), a 1912 film by Reliance Film Company
 Kaintuck (Still), a 1935 symphonic poem
 Kaintuck Hollow a valley in Missouri
 Kaintuck Territory, a theme park